Anarbek Ormonbekov (born 17 May 1971 in Kochkor-Ata) is a Kyrgyzstani professional footballer and football coach and currently assistant coach at FC Ordabasy. He played as striker and midfielder. He started his coaching career in 1982, and managed several Kazakh and Russian professional teams. In 1994, he was the head of Kyrgyzstan national football team.

Career

Managerial
Ormonbekov was appointed as the new manager of Dordoi Bishkek in November 2015. On 6 June 2016, Ormonbekov was fired as manager of Dordoi Bishkek due to poor results.

References

External links
Profile at Dordoi-Dynamo Naryn 
 Profil na Soccerway
 Profil na Soccerpunter

1971 births
Living people
Kyrgyzstani footballers
Association football midfielders
Association football forwards
Kyrgyzstani football managers
Kyrgyzstan national football team managers